The 2019 Utah Royals FC season marks the team's second year of existence and its second season in the National Women's Soccer League (NWSL), the top division of the American soccer pyramid.

In an effort to improve on the team's 5th place finish in 2018, the Royals signed former Spanish international and Spain's all-time leading scorer Vero Boquete for the 2019 season.

Utah encountered numerous injury problems to start the season as both Brittany Ratcliffe and Taylor Lytle suffered season ending injuries before the season began. Canadian international Diana Matheson suffered a toe injury with the Canadian National Team which would require surgery, this injury would also force her to miss the World Cup. To help deal with these absences, Utah claimed Mallory Weber off waivers from the Portland Thorns FC.

Six members of the Royals would miss games due to their participation at the 2019 FIFA Women's World Cup. Becky Sauerbrunn, Kelley O'Hara and Christen Press for the United States, Desiree Scott for Canada, Katie Bowen for New Zealand and Rachel Corsie for Scotland.

The Royals would lose another player at the end of June as defender Samantha Johnson announced her retirement from professional soccer.

Defender Kelley O'Hara suffered an ankle injury during the first USWNT victory tour match on August 3, she would miss the remainer of Utah's season due to this injury.

On August 14, Royals forward Christen Press was named NWSL Player of the Week for Week 17, this was the first time a player on the Utah Royals had received this award. Press was also named Player of the Month for August, which was also a first for the club.

The Royals were eliminated from playoff contention on September 28 after their fourth consecutive loss.

Utah defender Becky Sauerbrunn was named 2019 NWSL Defender of the Year, this was her fourth time winning the award, as she had previously won it three times while playing for FC Kansas City.

Competitions

Pre Season

NWSL Regular Season

Overall Table

Results summary

Results by round

Match results

April

May

June

July

August

September

October

Stats

Honors and awards

NWSL awards

Best XI

Second XI

NWSL Monthly Awards

NWSL Player of the Month

NWSL Team of the Month

NWSL Weekly Awards

NWSL Player of the Week

NWSL Goal of the Week

NWSL Save of the Week

Club

Roster

 Age calculated as of the start of the 2019 season.

Player Transactions
Transfers In

Transfers Out

2019 NWSL College Draft

 Source: National Women's Soccer League''

References

National Women's Soccer League